Lysinibacillus boronitolerans is a spore-forming, Gram-positive, motile, rod-shaped and boron-tolerant bacterium with type strain 10aT (=DSM 17140T =IAM 15262T = ATCC BAA-1146T).

References

Further reading

External links
LPSN

Type strain of Lysinibacillus boronitolerans at BacDive -  the Bacterial Diversity Metadatabase

Bacillaceae